Susan Hulme is a Scottish radio presenter, who presents the late-night radio programme Today in Parliament on BBC Radio.

Early life
She was born and brought up in Edinburgh. She came to university in England, where she studied biology then English at Pembroke College, Oxford, from 1983 to 1987. She edited the university magazine.

Career
She first worked as a medical journalist on New Scientist.

BBC
She moved to the BBC as a radio producer. She works for the BBC two days a week. She began presenting on Radio 4 in 1993.

Personal life
She has a daughter and two sons. She was featured in the Radio Times radio section in the first week of November 2006. She lives in Hertfordshire. Her partner is a retired BBC Editor.

See also
 Parliament of the United Kingdom
 BBC Parliament

References

External links
 Today in Parliament
 The Other Heartlands October 2008

Alumni of Pembroke College, Oxford
BBC Radio 4 presenters
Medical journalists
Mass media people from Edinburgh
Scottish political journalists
Scottish women journalists
Scottish radio presenters
Scottish women television presenters
Year of birth missing (living people)
Living people